The Pal Piccolo is a mountain in the Carnic Alps, located near Plöcken Pass, on the border between the Italian region of Friuli-Venezia Giulia and the Austrian state of Carinthia. It has an elevation of 1,866 metres.

Due to its position, the Pal Piccolo was heavily contested between Italy and Austria-Hungary during the First World War, from May 1915 to October 1917; the trenches and fortifications that litter the mountain to this day, along with two chapels built by the Alpini, are now part of an open-air museum.

References

Mountains of Friuli-Venezia Giulia
Mountains of Carinthia (state)
Carnic Alps
Mountains of the Alps
Mountains of Italy
Mountains of Austria
Military history of Italy during World War I

it:Pal Piccolo
ceb:Pal Piccolo
de:Kleiner Pal
sv:Pal Piccolo
zh:小帕爾山